State Highway 48 is a state highway in the Indian state of Andhra Pradesh It is also referred as Guntur-Bapatla-Chirala Road.

Route 

It starts at Guntur and passes through Ponnur, Bapatla and ends at Chirala.

See also 
 List of State Highways in Andhra Pradesh

References 

Transport in Guntur
State Highways in Andhra Pradesh
Roads in Guntur district
Roads in Prakasam district